
The Brunswick Pipeline is a natural gas transmission  pipeline in the Canadian province of New Brunswick.

It runs from the Canaport liquified natural gas (LNG) receiving and regasification terminal at Red Head in east Saint John, NB to Woodland, Maine in the United States where it connects to the Maritimes & Northeast Pipeline (M&NP).  It is owned by Emera.

Construction began in November 2007 and the pipeline entered service in July 2009.

Approval of the pipeline by the National Energy Board was controversial for several reasons.  The project was challenged by M&NP on the grounds that it was unnecessary and that their system's Saint John Lateral had sufficient capacity to handle the export-oriented requirements of LNG imported to the Canaport terminal.  M&NP contended that the Brunswick Pipeline was considered a "bullet" that bypassed their Canadian system to interconnect in Maine instead.  The project was also challenged for environmental reasons due to its route in the city of Saint John which crossed through Rockwood Park.

Owners
 Emera Inc. (100%)

See also
 Maritimes & Northeast Pipeline
 Heritage Gas Limited distributes natural gas to residential and commercial customers in Nova Scotia
 Enbridge Gas New Brunswick distributes natural gas to residential and commercial customers in New Brunswick

References

External links
Brunswick Pipeline

Transport in Saint John County, New Brunswick
Transport in Charlotte County, New Brunswick
Transport buildings and structures in New Brunswick
Transportation buildings and structures in Washington County, Maine
Energy in New England
Natural gas pipelines in Canada
Natural gas pipelines in the United States
Companies based in New Brunswick
Canada–United States relations
Emera
Natural gas pipelines in Maine